David Christie,  (October 1, 1818 – 14 December 1880) was a Canadian politician.

Born in Edinburgh, Scotland, he came to Canada with his family in 1833.

In 1852, he was elected to the 4th Parliament of the Province of Canada. He was re-elected to the 5th Parliament of the Province of Canada and 6th Parliament of the Province of Canada. David Christie was in frequent contact with George Brown who published The Globe newspaper.

In the fall of 1849, David Christie was a founding member of the Clear Grit movement.  Along with other Clear Grit supporters, Christie argued for a Canadian brand of republicanism that included the election of a deep number of government representatives.  David Christie also coined the term Clear Grit according to Charles Dent, who traces the term to a discussion between Christie and George Brown where Christie criticised any Reformer who would hang back like Brown, declaring "We want only men who are Clear Grit".

In 1858, he was elected to the Legislative Council of the Province of Canada. In 1867, he was summoned to the Senate of Canada representing the senatorial division of Erie, Ontario. A Liberal, the Honourable David Christie served until his death in 1880. From 1873 to 1874, he was the Secretary of State of Canada. From 1874 to 1878, he was the Speaker of the Senate of Canada. He died in Paris, Ontario in 1880 of complications arising from gangrene.

See also
 Canada, Kansas

References
 
 

1818 births
1880 deaths
Canadian senators from Ontario
Liberal Party of Canada senators
Members of the Legislative Assembly of the Province of Canada from Canada West
Members of the Legislative Council of the Province of Canada
Members of the King's Privy Council for Canada
Politicians from Edinburgh
Scottish emigrants to pre-Confederation Ontario
Speakers of the Senate of Canada
Immigrants to Upper Canada